The Supreme Security Council (SSC) (CSS) is an advisory body to the President of Moldova (concurrently the Supreme Commander-in-Chief of the Moldovan Armed Forces) which aides and assists the President in the implementation of military policy and national security decisions. Its authority is vested in the Constitution of Moldova. The President is one of many permanent members of the council and chairs all of its meetings. Permanent members of the council since October 2009 have included the following:

Members 
Maia Sandu – President of the SSC; President of Moldova
Ștefan Țîbuleac – Secretary of the SSC
Igor Grosu – President of the Moldovan Parliament
Dorin Recean – Prime Minister of Moldova
Lilian Carp – Chair of the Parliamentary Committee for National Security, Defense and Public Order
Anatolie Nosatîi – Minister of Defense
Ana Revenco – Minister of Internal Affairs
Alexandru Musteață – Director of the Security and Intelligence Service
Ion Munteanu – Acting Prosecutor General of Moldova
Octavian Armașu – Governor of the National Bank of Moldova 
Dumitru Alaiba  – Deputy Prime MInister, Minister of Economic Development and Digitalization 
Nicu Popescu – Deputy Prime Minister, Minister of Foreign Affairs and European Integration
Oleg Serebrian – Deputy Prime Minister for Reintegration
Veronica Mihailov-Moraru – Minister of Justice
Ala Nemerenco – Minister of Health 
Olesea Stamate – Chair of the Parliamentary Judicial Committee
Andrei Spînu – Secretary-General of the Office of the President 
Cristina Gherasimov – Foreign Policy and European Integration Advisor to the President 
Veaceslav Negruța – Economic Advisor to the President
Veronica Bradăuțanu – Judicial Advisor to the President
Vladimir Munteanu – First Deputy Governor of the National Bank of Moldova
Tatiana Răducanu
Iulian Groza

Whenever the new composition of the CSS is officiated, the president signs a decree to appoint them as council members. Other non-permanent members such as parliamentary faction leaders and intellectuals are also invited to attend. The composition was most recently changed in June 2019 by President Igor Dodon following the constitutional crisis that occurred.

In wartime, the CSS is renamed to the Supreme Council on Defense, to which the president chairs the council in their position as Supreme Commander-in-Chief.

See also
Government of Moldova
Supreme Council of National Defence (Romania)
National Security and Defense Council of Ukraine
Security Council of Russia

References

Government of Moldova
Military of Moldova
Moldova